Global Media and Communication is a triannual peer-reviewed academic journal that covers the field of communication studies. The editors-in-chief are Daya K. Thussu (University of Westminster), John Downing (Southern Illinois University),  Des Freedman (Goldsmiths), Clemencia Rodríguez (University of Oklahoma), and  Yuezhi Zhao. It was established in 2005 and is currently published by SAGE Publications.

Abstracting and indexing 
Global Media and Communication is abstracted and indexed in the following databases:
 Academic Premier
 Communication Abstracts
 Educational Research Abstracts Online
 International Bibliography of the Social Sciences
 Linguistics and Language Behavior Abstracts
 Scopus

References

External links

 

SAGE Publishing academic journals
English-language journals
Media studies journals
Triannual journals
Publications established in 2005